The Coastal Fleet of the Finnish Navy is the main naval fleet in the Finnish Navy. It is responsible for the territorial integrity of Finland and its territorial waters. Almost all of Finland's naval vessels are part of the Coastal Fleet.

Units

References

External links
 https://merivoimat.fi/rannikkolaivasto
 https://merivoimat.fi/en/coastal-fleet
 https://merivoimat.fi/rannikkolaivasto/tietoa-meista

Naval fleets
Naval units and formations of Finland
Military units and formations established in 2015